Wak'ani (Aymara wak'a girdle, -ni a suffix to indicate ownership,  "the one with a girdle", Hispanicized spelling Huacani) is a mountain in the Cordillera Real in the Andes of Bolivia,  high. It is located in the La Paz Department at the border of the Pedro Domingo Murillo Province, La Paz Municipality, and the Sud Yungas Province, Yanacachi Municipality. Wak'ani lies north-east of the city of La Paz, north to north-west of the mountains Jathi Qullu, Sirk'i Qullu and Mik'aya.

See also
 Chacaltaya
 Inkachaka Dam
 Mururata
 Sirk'i Quta
 Sura Qullu
List of mountains in the Andes

References 

Mountains of La Paz Department (Bolivia)